John Hickson was an American cinematographer. He cinematographed 24 films between 1928 and 1940.

External links

Year of birth missing
Year of death missing
American male film actors
American male silent film actors
20th-century American male actors